The Santiago Street Circuit is a temporary street circuit located in the city of Santiago, Chile. It was used for the Santiago ePrix of the single-seater, electrically powered Formula E championship on the date of 3 February 2018 for the 2018 Santiago ePrix.

Layout
It started in Avenue Santa María, in the northern side of the Mapocho River, crossing it on Pio Nono Bridge. After rounding Plaza Baquedano, it took the Alameda (Santiago's main avenue) to the west until reaching the Gabriela Mistral Cultural Center, where it turned back to the east and then crossed the Parque Forestal. After following Cardenal Caro Avenue, it turned back to the north in front of the Chilean National Museum of Fine Arts, and crossed the river again, returning to the start point.

References

External links 
 Antofagasta Minerals Santiago E-Prix

Formula E circuits
Defunct motorsport venues
Motorsport venues in Chile
Santiago ePrix